Grupo Aval is a Colombian holding company engaged in a wide variety of financial activities, including banking, telecommunications and real estate; in Colombia and Central America. Grupo Aval is controlled by Luis Carlos Sarmiento (estimated net worth of U$11,9 billion), who indirectly owns around 80 percent of its shares.

Operations

As a holding company, Grupo Aval owns sufficient amounts of voting stock in other companies to control their policies. In addition to its interests in numerous industrial sectors, Grupo Aval controls some of Colombia and Central America's top financial organizations, including:

 Banco de Bogotá S.A.
 Banco de Occidente S.A.
 Banco Popular S.A.
 Banco AV Villas S.A.
 Corficolombiana
BAC Credomatic with operations in Costa Rica, Panamá, Nicaragua, Guatemala, El Salvador, Honduras and the US State of Florida.
 Casa de Bolsa S.A. in Colombia. BAC Valores(Panamá), Inc. BAC San Jose, Puesto de Bolsa, S.A. in Costa Rica.

Pension fund management companys owned by the holding:
Porvenir S.A. in Colombia. BAC San José Pensiones Operadora de Planes de Pensiones Complementarias S.A. in Costa Rica before BSJ Porvenir.

Grupo Aval's internal staff consists of approximately 100 employees, dedicated to analyzing and identifying the most efficient financial and operating practices as well as recommending the implantation of these practices within organizations that the Group controls. To obtain these objectives, Grupo Aval is divided into three business divisions that include: (1) Investments and Strategic Planning, (2) Risk Management, (3) Corporative Services and (3) Technological Information.

History

On April 18, 1997, the Group formally changed its trading name from Administraciones Bancarias S.A. to Sociedad A.B. S.A. On January 8, 1998, the Group once again changed its name to Grupo Aval Acciones y Valores S.A. Later that year, Grupo Aval introduced an Online banking platform, which was integrated within the Group's major banking subsidiaries, Banco de Bogotá, Banco de Occidente, Banco Popular and Banco AV Villas. This innovation allowed clients to either conduct financial transactions on the Internet or in real-time at anyone of the banks branch offices or automated teller machines.

A major milestone occurred during 1999 when Grupo Aval listed their shares publicly on the Bolsa de Valores de Colombia (the Colombian stock exchange) for the first time in the company's history. The Group made a massive initial public offering of 1,200,774,970 shares of common stock between November 1 and December 31, 1999. By December 31, 1999, Aval had 40,042 shareholders. The final result of the IPO was the sale of 312,062,341 shares of common stock, or 2.58 percent of their total, with a fair market value of $58,190,135,296. In 2000, plans to list Grupo Aval on the New York Stock Exchange were postponed due to Wall Street's unfavorable climate for emerging market funds at the time.

As of 2007, Luis Carlos Sarmiento continues to run the company with assistance from his son Luis Carlos Sarmiento Gutierrez, whom he is grooming to eventually assume control of the family conglomerate.

Due to GE Capital focusing on industrial activity rather than retail banking, the group acquired for US$1.9 billion BAC|Credomatic Network from GE Consumer Finance in July 2010

Grupo Aval made a debut global offering of $600 million in February 2012 with advisory assistance from New York law firm Davis Polk & Wardwell.

AVAL's current earnings (2017) per share is $.65. Zacks Investment Research reports AVAL's forecasted earnings growth in 2017 as 3.62%, compared to an industry average of 8.1%.

Regulation
The Group is supervised by the Colombian Superintendency of Securities because of its size and because its shares are registered on the Colombia Stock Exchange.

See also

 Banco de Bogotá
 Banco de Occidente Credencial
 BAC Credomatic

References

External links

 

Colombian brands
Companies based in Bogotá
Companies listed on the Colombia Stock Exchange
Investment companies of Colombia